Marco Gabriel de Oliveira Santos (born 16 November 2000), simply known as Marco, is a Brazilian footballer who plays as either a central defender or a left back for Volta Redonda, on loan from Portuguesa.

Club career
Born in São Paulo, Marco joined Portuguesa's youth setup in 2019, after representing Osasco FC and São José-SP. He made his senior debut for the side on 25 November 2020, coming on as a second-half substitute for Maikinho in a 2–0 home win over Guarani, for the year's Copa Paulista.

Marco was promoted to the main squad for the 2021 season, and made his first appearance as a starter on 5 July 2021, providing an assist for Caíque's opener in a 2–0 Série D home win over São Bento; he was later praised by manager Fernando Marchiori. He was a backup option during the 2022 Campeonato Paulista Série A2, as his side achieved promotion as champions.

Marco scored his first senior goal on 10 September 2022, netting the winner in a 1–0 home success over Desportivo Brasil. On 26 December, he was loaned to Série C side Volta Redonda until the end of 2023; he also renewed his contract with Lusa until 2024.

Career statistics

Honours
Portuguesa
Copa Paulista: 2020
Campeonato Paulista Série A2: 2022

References

2000 births
Living people
Footballers from São Paulo
Brazilian footballers
Association football defenders
Campeonato Brasileiro Série D players
Associação Portuguesa de Desportos players
Volta Redonda FC players